Apospasta eriopygioides is a moth of the family Noctuidae. It is found in Tanzania.

References

External links
Images of the types in the Swedish Museum of Natural History

Hadeninae
Moths described in 1910